Houston Fancher (born February 17, 1966) is an American basketball coach, previously the interim head coach of the Charlotte 49ers men's basketball team. Prior to that, he worked for four years at Tennessee, and the last two as the Director of Basketball Operations. From 2000 to 2009, he was the men's head basketball coach of the Mountaineers at Appalachian State University. His first two seasons saw his team go 11–20, and 10–18, respectively. The following season, 2002–03, his team went 19–10, and Fancher was named the Southern Conference Coach of the Year. In the 2006–07 season, his squad won a school record 25 games, but failed to make the NCAA tournament, instead garnering Appalachian's first National Invitation Tournament (NIT) berth instead. On March 16, 2009, Fancher resigned as head coach following a disappointing 2008–09 season.

On April 2, 2015, Fancher was named assistant coach on the staff of new Charlotte 49ers head coach Mark Price. He was elevated to interim head coach after Price's sudden firing on December 14, 2017.

On March 6, 2018, following a 3–17 record, Fancher was notified by incoming athletics director Mike Hill that he would not be retained through the 2018–19 season and that a nationwide search for a permanent men's basketball coach would begin immediately.

Head coaching record

Notes

References

External links
 Bio on GoASU

1966 births
Living people
Basketball coaches from Tennessee
Appalachian State Mountaineers men's basketball coaches
Basketball players from Tennessee
Charlotte 49ers men's basketball coaches
College men's basketball head coaches in the United States
Middle Tennessee Blue Raiders men's basketball players
People from Newport, Tennessee
Vanderbilt Commodores men's basketball coaches
American men's basketball players